William Geary  may refer to:

Sir William Geary, 2nd Baronet (1756–1825), MP for Kent 1796–1806 and 1812–1818
Sir William Geary, 3rd Baronet (1825–1877), MP for West Kent 1835–1837
Sir William Nevill Montgomerie Geary, 5th Baronet (1895–1944), see Geary baronets

See also
Geary (disambiguation)